The Maltese passport is a passport that is issued to citizens of Malta. Every Maltese citizen is also a Commonwealth citizen and citizen of the European Union. The passport, along with the national identity card, allows for free rights of movement and residence in all member states of the European Economic Area, as well as Switzerland.

Physical appearance

Maltese passports share the common design standards of European Union passports. The cover is burgundy with the coat of arms of Malta emblazoned in the centre. The words "UNJONI EWROPEA" (English: European Union) and "MALTA" are inscribed above the coat of arms and the word "PASSAPORT" (English: Passport) and the international biometric passport symbol are inscribed below it.

Passport note

The passport contains a note from the issuing authority addressed to the authorities of all other states, identifying the bearer as a citizen of Malta and requesting that they be allowed to pass and be treated according to international norms. The note inside of a Maltese passport states:

Visa requirements

Visa requirements for Maltese citizens are administrative entry restrictions imposed by the authorities of foreign states on citizens of Malta.  Maltese citizens had visa-free or visa on arrival access (including eTAs) to 185 countries and territories, ranking the Maltese passport 8th in the world in terms of travel freedom (tied with Australian, Canadian, Czech, and Greek passports) according to the Henley Passport Index. Additionally, Arton Capital's Passport Index ranked the Maltese passport 5th in the world in terms of travel freedom, with a mobility score of 171 (tied with Singaporean and Slovak passports), 

Maltese citizens can live and work in any country within the European Economic Area (including the member states of the EU and the European Free Trade Association) as a result of the right of free movement and residence granted in Article 21 of the Treaty on the Functioning of the European Union.

Investment-based citizenship scheme 

Malta began a citizenship by investment scheme in 2014 known as the Individual Investor Programme (IIP) where non-citizens could apply for Maltese citizenship in exchange for a significant contribution to a national development fund and other Maltese investments, contingent on maintaining residence in Malta and passing criminal background checks. Henley & Partners was originally appointed as sole agent to administer the IIP, but the Maltese government later opened the scheme to Maltese firms too. The procedure is overseen by the Citizenship Unit of the government's Identity Malta Agency.

The number and background of persons granted Maltese citizenship based on investment is unknown, as the Maltese government does not publish such data. Malta's Data Protection Commissioner confirmed that the publication of the number of passport buyers and their country of origin “may prejudice relations with a number of the countries of origin” and that revealing the agencies that handled their application “could reasonably be expected to prejudice commercial interests and, ultimately, the competitiveness of approved agents as it would reveal commercially-sensitive information”.

The list of persons who were naturalised Maltese in the year 2015 includes over 900 names (listed by first name) without indication of previous/second citizenships and of reasons for naturalisation.  This was criticised as not transparent enough. Most investors are understood to be interested in acquiring Maltese citizenship only as a tool to use EU citizenship rights and reside elsewhere in the Union. The European Parliament had objected to the programme as a sell-out of EU citizenship.

The income from Malta's passport sale amounted to €163.5 million in 2016. Of this, 70% is deposited in the National Development and Social Fund (NDSF), which was set up in July 2016. The use of the fund by the government is not regulated.

Criticism 

The scheme has often come under fire for being a fraudulent scheme where the Maltese Government sells EU citizenship to anyone willing to pay the price, legitimately or illegally, to the detriment of the Maltese people and the European Union as a whole. Many who were granted a Maltese passport were found to be large-scale international criminals with ties to money laundering in multiple countries. The background checks performed on those willing to pay for citizenship have been criticized as being almost non-existent.

Although the scheme is leaving money in the Maltese economy, it is doing so at the expense of the average Maltese citizen, as the Golden Passport scheme is partly responsible for the enormous inflation of the Maltese Housing Index since its introduction. This phenomenon occurs because passport applicants are required to purchase or rent a property in Malta in order for the passport to be granted. Many of these properties have been found to left vacant with the owner in many occasions never even stepping foot in Malta.

With the contraction of the housing supply playing its part in pushing property prices to record levels, the average Maltese citizen is being priced out. With rents also on the increase the island has started to see the prevalence of homelessness, something which before these last few years was non-existent in Malta.

See also

 Henley & Partners Visa Restrictions Index
 Immigration to Malta
 Maltese identity card
 Maltese nationality law 
 Passports of the European Union
 Visa requirements for Maltese citizens

References

External links

 Passport & Civil Registration Directorate

Passports by country
Government of Malta
European Union passports